Belavia is the Belarus flag carrier airline which flies to four domestic destinations and a number of international airports. Following the Ryanair Flight 4978 incident on 23 May 2021, the airline was banned from overflight and landings in all European Union member states as well as the United Kingdom, Switzerland and Ukraine.

2020 coronavirus outbreak 
On 12 March 2020, Belavia suspended until 15 April its Minsk-Rome service due to the coronavirus pandemic.

On 14 March it was announced that connections to Ukraine (Kyiv, Lviv, Odessa, Kharkiv) were to be shut down from 17 March to 31 March, to Larnaca Cyprus from 15 to 30 March 2020, and to Warsaw from 15 to 27 March 2020.

On 18 March, flights were cancelled to Kazan, Krasnodar, Moscow–Zhukovsky, Nizhny Novgorod, Rostov-on-Don, Sochi, Voronezh.

Destinations
The list includes the city, country, and the airport's name, with the airline's hub marked.

References

Lists of airline destinations